Dies irae is a 13th-century Latin hymn.

Dies Irae may also refer to:

Music
Dies Irae (band), a Polish death metal band
Dies Irae (Devil Doll album), a 1996 album by the band Devil Doll
Dies Irae (Noir Désir album), a 1994 live album by the band Noir Désir
Dies Irae (Tina Guo album), a 2021 album by Tina Guo
"Dies Irae", a song by Bathory from the 1988 album Blood Fire Death
"Dies Irae", a song by German symphonic power metal band Beyond the Black from the 2016 album Lost in Forever
"Dies Irae", a section of Giuseppe Verdi's Requiem
"Dies Irae", a song by Zbigniew Preisner from the 1998 album Requiem for My Friend

Literature
Dies Irae, a 2014 novella by William R. Forstchen
"Dies Irae", a short story by Slovak novelist Martin Kukučín
"Dies Irae", a 1985 short story by Charles Sheffield
"Dies Irae", an English translation of a philosophical essay by Jean-Luc Nancy

Other
Dies irae (visual novel), a Japanese visual novel originally released in 2007
Dies Irae (TV series), an anime adaptation of the visual novel
an Imperator-class Titan mech from Warhammer 40,000

See also
 Day of Wrath, a 1943 film